Edward Mitchell (1859–1921) was an Irish Russellite Unionist politician.

He defeated James Craig to be elected as the Member of Parliament (MP) for North Fermanagh at a by-election on 20 March 1903 after the resignation of the Unionist MP Edward Archdale.

At the next general election, in January 1906 the Russellites did not manage to hold their early by-election gains.  They won one new seat, but lost to mainstream Unionists both of the seats gained at by-elections, including Mitchell's. He did not stand again.

References

External links 
 

1852 births
1921 deaths
Members of the Parliament of the United Kingdom for County Fermanagh constituencies (1801–1922)
UK MPs 1900–1906
Russellite Unionist MPs